Richard Kreul (April 26, 1924 – February 25, 2011) was a member of the Wisconsin State Senate.

Biography
Kreul was born Richard Theodore Kreul on April 26, 1924, in Mount Ida, Wisconsin. In 1943, he married Geraldine Ann Walker. They had five children. Kreul was a member of the United Methodist Church. He was a farmer and real estate broker. Kreul also served on the Fennimore School Board. He died on February 25, 2011, in Fennimore, Wisconsin.

Career
Kreul was a member of the Senate from 1978 to 1991. He was a Republican.

References

External links

People from Grant County, Wisconsin
School board members in Wisconsin
Republican Party Wisconsin state senators
Businesspeople from Wisconsin
1924 births
2011 deaths
People from Fennimore, Wisconsin
20th-century American businesspeople